The Metropolitan Borough of Wigan is a metropolitan borough of Greater Manchester, in North West England. It is named after the main settlement of Wigan but covers a far larger area, extending up to 9 miles eastwards, including the towns of Atherton, Ashton-in-Makerfield, Golborne, Hindley, Ince-in-Makerfield, Leigh and Tyldesley. The borough also covers the villages and suburbs of Abram, Aspull, Astley, Bryn, Hindley Green, Lowton, Mosley Common, Orrell, Pemberton, Shevington, Standish, Winstanley and Worsley Mesnes. The borough is also the second-most populous district in Greater Manchester.

The borough was formed in 1974, replacing several former local government districts. It is the furthest west part of Greater Manchester, and it is bordered by the Greater Manchester boroughs of City of Salford and Bolton to the east, the Cheshire borough of Warrington to the south, the Merseyside borough of St Helens to the south west, and the Lancashire boroughs of West Lancashire to the west and Chorley to the north.

History
Wigan metropolitan borough was created on 1 April 1974 by the Local Government Act 1972. It was formed from the former county borough of Wigan along with other local government units from the administrative county of Lancashire. These were the Municipal Borough of Leigh, the urban districts of Abram, Aspull, Atherton, Hindley, Ince-in-Makerfield, Orrell, Standish and Tyldesley. Ashton-in-Makerfield except for the parish of Seneley Green, the Golborne Urban District except for the parish of Culcheth and Glazebury in Warrington, the Higher End part of Billinge and Winstanley Urban District and the civil parishes of Haigh, Shevington and Worthington from the Wigan Rural District were included.

Before its creation, the name Wigan-Leigh was used in the Redcliffe-Maud Report. It was also suggested that the new metropolitan borough be named Makerfield. However, both names were rejected by a vote of 12 to 2. According to an opinion poll in 2003, 26% of 299 residents surveyed felt they belonged "very strongly" or "fairly strongly" (4% very strongly) to Greater Manchester, 64% (28% very strongly) to the borough of Wigan, and 63% (31% very strongly) to Lancashire.

The metropolitan borough was created from a highly industrialised area of Lancashire that was part of the Lancashire Coalfield and had an important textile industry.

Geography
The borough is the most north western in Greater Manchester. Within Greater Manchester it borders the Metropolitan Borough of Bolton to the north-east and east, and the City of Salford to the east. Outwith Greater Manchester, in the south it borders Warrington (a unitary authority in Cheshire); to the south-west it borders the Metropolitan Borough of St Helens in Merseyside. To the west it borders the West Lancashire borough, and to the north it borders the Chorley borough, both in Lancashire.

Wigan borough has seven Local Nature Reserves: including Wigan Flashes LNR, Borsdane Wood LNR, between Hindley and Aspull, Greenslate Water Meadows LNR within Orrell Water Park in Orrell, Low Hall LNR between Hindley and Platt Bridge, Pennington Flash LNR, Kirkless LNR at Ince and Three Sisters LNR, Ashton-In-Makerfield.

Governance

Local government

For 12 years after the county was created in 1974, the borough had a two-tier system of local government, and Wigan Council shared power with the Greater Manchester County Council. The county council was abolished in 1986 by the Local Government Act 1985. In April 2011, the Greater Manchester Combined Authority became the top tier of local government within Greater Manchester, covering ten boroughs including Wigan.

The first elections to the borough council were held on 10 May 1973. The Metropolitan Borough Council is divided into 25 wards, each of which elects three councillors. Elections are by thirds, with one councillor from each ward up for re-election in each election year.  The borough council has a leader and cabinet system. The current leader is David Molyneux who took over from Peter Smith, who resigned in May 2018, having been leader since 1991. The council rejected the idea of a directly elected mayor following a consultation in 2001.

The Metropolitan Borough of Wigan is traditionally a Labour Party stronghold - the council has been Labour-controlled since its creation. The local elections in 1998 resulted in a council with only two non-Labour members.

Labour had a majority with 43 seats at the 2006 election. The second-largest party was the local Community Action Party which had 15 seats. Community Action first contested Wigan elections in 2002, and won 18 seats in the 2004 election following the re-warding - their councilors are for wards in the middle of the borough, between Wigan and Leigh. The Conservative Party had nine seats, and the Liberal Democrats eight.

At the 2008 elections Labour was the largest party with 41 seats out of a total of 75; the Conservative Party had 14 seats, Community Action Party eight seats, Independent seven seats, Liberal Democrats four seats, and one was vacant.

In November 2010 (after elections in May), Labour was the largest party with 51 seats out of a total of 75; the Conservative Party had eight seats, Independents seven seats, Community Action Party four seats, Liberal Democrats three seats (one member currently suspended) and two members were 'Independent Conservative'.

As of June 2011 (after May elections), Labour continued to be the largest party with 58 seats out of 75, the Independent Councillor group with 8 seats form the official opposition, the Conservative Party had 5 seats, the Liberal Democrats hold 2 seats, Community Action Party 1 seat and 1 Independent councillor.

In May 2012 (post 2012 Local Elections) the composition of the council was Labour 63 (+5), Others 9 (-1), Liberal Democrats 2 (No change) and Conservatives 1 ( -4).

Presently in May 2018, the Council's political composition is: Labour 60, Conservatives 7, Independent 4, Independent Network 2, Shevington Independents 1, and Standish Independents 1.

The council uses Wigan Town Hall as its main headquarters. Leigh Town Hall is used as a secondary base.

Townships and wards

The borough is divided into 25 electoral wards, each of which elect three councillors.  The present wards were adopted in 2003, following a review by the Boundary Commission, the previous review took place in 1979.  The borough was formerly divided in 24 wards. Wigan Council has divided the borough into ten areas by the name of townships, with a Township Manager and a Township Forum each.

Parishes
The borough has three civil parishes: Haigh, Shevington and Worthington. The rest of the borough is an unparished area. Ecclesiastical parishes in the west of the borough are part of the Anglican Diocese of Liverpool and the Roman Catholic Archdiocese of Liverpool, Anglican parishes in the east of the Metropolitan Borough are part of the Diocese of Manchester and the northern section part of the Diocese of Blackburn.

Parliamentary
The Wigan Metropolitan Borough is currently covered by four parliamentary constituencies, Wigan, Makerfield, Leigh, and Bolton West. (Atherton is the only Wigan ward included in Bolton West, with the rest of the constituency made up of wards from Bolton Borough). New constituency boundaries recommended by the Boundary Commission for the 2010 general election saw the link to Salford broken by the removal of Wigan areas from the Worsley constituency. This resulted in the Worsley constituency wards of Tyldesley and Astley-Mosley Common being placed in the Leigh Constituency with the Atherton ward becoming part of Bolton West. Makerfield is the only constituency to have returned Labour MPs continuously since 1906.

Coat of arms
Wigan council's new coat of arms is based on various elements from the arms of the councils of its predecessor districts.

Demography

With a population of around 300,000, Wigan is the second most populous borough of Greater Manchester, after Manchester.  It has one of the lowest ethnic minority populations, with the 2001 census reporting 98.7% of the population as white. Unemployment is around the average for England and Wales.  Approximately 9.5% of the population was recorded as being permanently sick or disabled compared to a national average of 5.5%.

Population change
The table details the population change since 1801, including the percentage change since the last available census data. Although the Metropolitan Borough of Wigan has existed since 1974, figures have been generated by combining data from the towns, villages, and civil parishes that became constituent parts of the borough.

The population of the borough has remained roughly static since the 1970s at around 300,000, second to Manchester within Greater Manchester.

The ONS identify the Wigan Built-up Area as the western part of the district, as well as Skelmersdale and Upholland in West Lancashire, with a population of 166,840. 

It considers towns in the east of the borough, Hindley, Leigh, Golborne, Atherton and Tyldesley to be part of the Greater Manchester Built-up Area.

Aspull and Shevington are identified as standalone urban areas and Ashton-in-Makerfield is considered to be part of the Liverpool Built-up area, sitting at the border with St Helen’s. The entirety of the Wigan borough forms part of the Manchester Larger Urban Zone

Ethnicity

Transport
Public transport in Wigan MBC is co-ordinated by Transport for Greater Manchester (TfGM). 

The borough is served by an extensive bus network with most services operated by Stagecoach Manchester, Arriva North West First Greater Manchester and Diamond North West. There are two major bus stations in both Wigan and Leigh town centres. Services operate from the bus stations to Bolton, Manchester, the Trafford Centre, St Helens and Chorley, as well as local inter-urban routes, with three high frequency services between Wigan and Leigh bus stations, operated by Stagecoach Manchester. Leigh, Atherton and Tyldesley are also served by the high frequency Vantage services, via a guided busway, connecting the towns to Central Manchester in 30-40 minutes outside of peaks.  

Several railway lines cross the borough. Wigan Wallgate railway station is served by Northern trains on the Manchester to Southport and Kirkby lines. There are services to stations towards Manchester, serving all city centre stations including Manchester Victoria and Manchester Piccadilly via two routes: one through Bolton and one via Atherton, with connections to other local and national destinations. Wigan North Western railway station is on the West Coast Main Line served by Northern and Avanti West Coast. There are services to Liverpool Lime Street, Blackpool North, London Euston, Birmingham, Glasgow and Edinburgh. Other stations in the borough are Atherton, Hag Fold, Bryn, Gathurst, Hindley, Ince, Orrell, and Pemberton. Appley Bridge railway station just outside the border with West Lancashire is managed by TfGM and serves the far north-western part of the borough. There is a campaign for Golborne railway station and Kenyon Junction station to be re-opened. The Liverpool-Manchester line 
(Chat Moss route) crosses the far south of the borough but has no railway station since the 60's after Kenyon Junction railway station, Astley railway station, 
Lamb's Cottage railway station, Flow Moss railway station and Glazebury and Bury Lane railway station closed.

Leigh is one of the largest towns in the UK without a railway station. Westleigh station, on the Bolton and Leigh Railway, closed in 1954. Leigh and Tyldesley stations on the Tyldesley Loopline were closed in 1969.

The Leeds and Liverpool and Bridgewater canals meet in Leigh town centre. The M6 motorway crosses the west of the borough, and serves Ashton-in-Makerfield at junctions 23 and 24 (north only) and 25 (south only), Wigan at junction 25 (south only), Wigan/Orrell at junction 26 and Standish junction 27. The M58 motorway, to Liverpool, terminates at junction 26 of the M6 near Orrell. The dual carriageway A580 East Lancashire Road linking Liverpool to Manchester crosses the south of the borough.The A579 runs from Bolton to the M6 via Atherleigh Way, which runs from the west of Atherton, bypassing Leigh town centre to reach the East Lancashire Road at the Warrington border.

Twinning
The Metropolitan Borough of Wigan has one twin town in France.

Freedom of the Borough
The following people and military units have received the Freedom of the Borough of Wigan.

Individuals
 James Lindsay, 26th Earl of Crawford: January 1900.
 Sir William Gorman: 1954.
 David Whelan: 30 August 2007.
 Lord Smith of Leigh: 7 December 2011.

Military units
 D Squadron (TA Reserve) Royal Mercian and Lancastrian Yeomanry:  27 February 2008.
 The Duke of Lancaster's Regiment: 2 December 2019.

References

Notes

Bibliography

External links
 
 

 
 
Metropolitan boroughs of Greater Manchester